Juan Antonio Ovalle y Morales ( – July 12, 1819) was a Chilean politician, lawyer and landowner. He served as the first president of the First National Congress of Chile where he was elected as deputy for Santiago. 

His tenure as congressman came to an end following the 1811 coup d'état when José Miguel Carrera issued a decree decreasing the number of deputies for Santiago. He was subsequently confined to his estancia in Curacaví.

Ovalle was afterwards sent to the Juan Fernández Islands in November 1814, being finally returned to the mainland in September 1815.

References

1819 deaths
People of the Chilean War of Independence
Presidents of the Chamber of Deputies of Chile